Ercole Coppola (15 February, 1603 – 1658) was a Roman Catholic prelate who served as Bishop of Nicotera (1651–1658).

Biography
Ercole Coppola was born in Gallipoli, Italy on 15 February 1603.
On 22 May 1651, he was appointed during the papacy of Pope Innocent X as Bishop of Nicotera.
On 29 May 1651, he was consecrated bishop by Marcantonio Franciotti, Cardinal-Priest of Santa Maria della Pace, with Giambattista Spada, Patriarch of Constantinople, and Ranuccio Scotti Douglas, Bishop Emeritus of Borgo San Donnino, serving as co-consecrators. 
He served as Bishop of Nicotera until his death in 1658.

References 

17th-century Italian Roman Catholic bishops
Bishops appointed by Pope Innocent X
1603 births
1658 deaths